Get Closer is Seals and Crofts's eighth studio album. The title cut made the top 10 on 2 charts in early 1976, reaching #6 in Pop, and #2 in Adult Contemporary. It would be their final top 10 pop hit. "Goodbye Old Buddies" reached #10 on the US AC chart as well and #8 on the Canadian AC chart.

The song "Get Closer" features the vocals of Carolyn Willis, who had been in the group Honey Cone.
 
"Sweet Green Fields" was sampled in the 1997 song "Put Your Hands Where My Eyes Could See" by Busta Rhymes. It was also sampled in 2002 by Syleena Johnson on "Tonight I'm Gonna Let Go" which was based on "Put Your Hands Where My Eyes Could See".

Track listing 
Side One
"Sweet Green Fields" (James Seals)  4:45
"Get Closer" (Seals, Dash Crofts, arrangement Gene Page)  3:57
"Red Long Ago" (Seals, Bob Gundry, Kelley McKinney)  5:25
"Goodbye Old Buddies" (Parker McGee)  2:50

Side Two
"Baby Blue" (Seals, Crofts)  3:20
"Million Dollar Horse" (Seals, Walter Heath)  3:45
"Don't Fail" (Seals)  3:50
"Passing Thing" (Seals, Crofts)  6:25

Charts

Personnel 
 James Seals – lead vocals (except on "Goodbye Old Buddies"), guitar
 Dash Crofts – lead vocals, mandolin
 Louis Shelton – guitar, production
 Ray Parker Jr. – guitar
 Lee Ritenour – guitar
 David Paich – keyboards, string arrangements on "Red Long Ago" and "Don't Fail"
 Joe Sample – electric piano
 David Hungate – bass
 Wilton Felder – bass
 Jeff Porcaro – drums
 Ed Greene – drums
 Milt Holland – tabla
 Jim Horn – alto sax
 Carolyn Willis – backing vocals, lead vocal on "Get Closer"
 Merna Matthews – backing vocals
 Shirley Matthews – backing vocals
 Carol Carmichel – backing vocals
 Donnie Shelton – backing vocals

References

1976 albums
Seals and Crofts albums
Warner Records albums